Walter Peak may refer to:
 Walter Peak (Canada), on the border of Alberta and British Columbia
 Walter Peak (New Zealand), near Queenstown, South Island